Faisal Rashid (born 1972) is a British Labour politician who served as the Member of Parliament (MP) for Warrington South from 2017 to 2019.

Early life and career
Rashid was educated at the National College of Business Administration and Economics in Lahore. He has worked as a manager at HBOS and NatWest Bank.

Rashid served as a Member of Warrington Borough Council from 2011 until 2017, resigning following his election to Parliament. He was the first Muslim Mayor of Warrington, serving from May 2016 to May 2017.

Parliamentary career
Rashid was elected as the MP for Warrington South at the 2017 general election, defeating incumbent Conservative and then government minister David Mowat.

In May 2018, Rashid apologised over a tweet which critics suggested was encouraging voters to vote more than once. Rashid said the well-known and jocular phrase "vote early, vote often, vote Labour", was sent by a member of staff.

In October 2018, it was reported that Rashid had been on five overseas trips, worth almost £10,000 in total, since his election. The trips were to Pakistani-controlled Kashmir, China, Germany, Qatar and the West Bank and Israel and the cost met by NGOs, companies or overseas governments. Rashid responded that "These trips are largely educational in purpose. The opportunity to meet with individuals on the ground provides invaluable opportunities for learning and understanding. On occasions, the trips have also focused on enabling MPs to support British businesses abroad and on advancing bilateral relations. These are key aspects of a member of Parliament’s role, especially as the UK looks to redefine its position in the world post-Brexit." Rashid sat on the Parliamentary International Trade Select Committee and the Committees on Arms Export Controls.

In June 2019, Rashid urged Warrington Borough Council to declare a climate emergency.

While Warrington voted to Leave the EU in 2016, Rashid supported a second referendum on Britain's EU membership and would have campaigned for Remain.

Rashid lost his seat at the 2019 general election to the Conservative candidate Andy Carter.

Post-parliamentary career
After his departure from parliament, Rashid established a finance company, Westminster Finance Limited.

In July 2021, he was elected chair of the Warrington South Constituency Labour Party.

References

External links

1972 births
Living people
British businesspeople
British politicians of Pakistani descent
British Muslims
Labour Party (UK) MPs for English constituencies
Mayors of Warrington
UK MPs 2017–2019
National College of Business Administration and Economics alumni